Mixomelia is a genus of moths of the family Noctuidae.

Species
Based on Home of Ichneumonoidea:
Mixomelia adda  (Swinhoe, 1902)
Mixomelia albapex  (Hampson, 1895) 
Mixomelia albeola  (Rothschild, 1915) 
Mixomelia aroa  (Bethune-Baker, 1908) 
Mixomelia cidaroides  (Hampson, 1891) 
Mixomelia ctenucha (Turner, 1902) 
Mixomelia decipiens  Hampson, 1898 
Mixomelia digramma  Prout, 1928 
Mixomelia duplexa  (Moore, 1882)
Mixomelia duplicinota  (Hampson, 1895) 
Mixomelia erecta  (Moore, 1882) 
Mixomelia erythropoda  (Hampson, 1896) 
Mixomelia palumbina  (Butler, 1889) 
Mixomelia producta  (Hampson, 1907) 
Mixomelia relata  (Hampson, 1891) 
Mixomelia rivulosa  (Wileman, 1915) 
Mixomelia saccharivora  (Butler, 1889)

References

Natural History Museum Lepidoptera genus database

Herminiinae
Noctuoidea genera